The Life of Na Woon-gyu (나운규 일생 Na Woon-Gyui ilsaeng) is 1967 South Korean film is about life and death of Na Woon-gyu who was film actor and director who struggled for rise of Korean cinema during Japanese rule of Korea. Na was played by the film's actor and director  Choi Moo-ryong who was father of Choi Min-soo

Cast
Choi Moo-ryong
Park Am
Um Aing-ran
Kim Ji-mee
Jo Mi-ryeong
Lee Bin-hwa
Choi Nam-Hyun
Jeong Chang-geun
Jeong Ae-ran
Park Ji-hyeon
Lee Soon-jae

External links
 
 

South Korean biographical films
1967 films
1960s biographical films
Biographical films about actors
1960s Korean-language films